Ambuyat is a dish derived from the interior trunk of the sago palm. It is a starchy bland substance, similar to tapioca starch. Ambuyat is the national dish of Brunei, and a local specialty in the Malaysian states of Sarawak, Sabah, and the federal territory of Labuan, where it is sometimes known as linut.

Ambuyat is eaten with a bamboo chopstick called chandas, by rolling the starch around the prongs and then dipping it into a sauce, of which there are many varieties. One of the best sauce that well known by Bruneian societies Tempoyak.

There is a similar dish in eastern Indonesia called papeda.
It has a glutinous texture and is chewy.

See also 
 Indonesian cuisine

References 

Bruneian cuisine
Malaysian cuisine
Staple foods
National dishes